James Michael Flanigan Sr. (born April 15, 1945) is a former American football linebacker who played in the National Football League (NFL).

College career
Flanigan attended the University of Pittsburgh and played linebacker on the Panthers' football team. Flanigan was 6' 3" feet tall and weighed 240 pounds.

Professional career
Flanigan was drafted by the Green Bay Packers in the 2nd round (51st overall) of the 1967 NFL Draft. He played 40 games for the Packers between 1967 and 1970. He was a member of the Super Bowl Champions of 1967. He also played at middle linebacker in 14 games for the New Orleans Saints in 1971, giving him a total of 54 professional games.

Personal

His son Jim Flanigan Jr. played at the University of Notre Dame and professionally for the Chicago Bears, the Green Bay Packers, the San Francisco 49ers, and the Philadelphia Eagles during his 9-year career.

References

1945 births
Living people
Players of American football from Pittsburgh
American football linebackers
Pittsburgh Panthers football players
Green Bay Packers players
New Orleans Saints players